The Danamon Open is a defunct WTA Tour affiliated tennis tournament played from 1993 to 1997. It was held at the Gelora Senayan Stadium in Jakarta in Indonesia and was played on outdoor hardcourts.

Finals

Singles

Doubles

See also
 Jakarta Open – men's tournament

References
 WTA Results Archive

 
Hard court tennis tournaments
Tennis tournaments in Indonesia
Sport in Jakarta
WTA Tour
Recurring sporting events established in 1993
Recurring events disestablished in 1997
Defunct tennis tournaments in Indonesia
Defunct sports competitions in Indonesia